Agent Sparks was an American indie pop band formed in early 2005 when two former band mates from Audiovent decided they wanted to continue making music.  Members include Benjamin Einziger (lead vocals, guitar), Stephanie Eitel (lead vocals, keyboard, percussion), Paul Fried (bass, vocals), and George Purviance (drums, vocals).  

They released their first EP entitled Not So Merry in September 2005. This EP included, "It's Not My Time," "Choke," and "So Long Darlings." On June 20, 2006 they released their first full-length album Red Rover. Both their EP and full length were produced by Ben's brother and Paul's stepbrother, Incubus guitarist Michael Einziger. The band later went on to tour with bands Thirty Seconds to Mars and Veruca Salt. After releasing their debut full-length album, Red Rover in 2006, and embarking on a cross-country tour with Hoobastank, the band broke up.

Discography

EPs
 Not So Merry (2005)

Studio albums
 Red Rover (2006)

References

External links
Agent Sparks on Myspace

Musical groups established in 2005
Indie pop groups from California
People from Calabasas, California